Travis Gutiérrez Senger is an American director, writer and producer. His debut feature, Desert Cathedral, starring Lee Tergesen, was released by Random Media and The Orchard on September 27, 2016.

Senger's documentary short, White Lines and the Fever: The Death of DJ Junebug, which featured Kurtis Blow and DJ Hollywood, won awards at Tribeca and SXSW in 2010.

Awards and nominations

References

External links

Living people
1980s births
American film producers
University of Washington alumni
Film directors from New York (state)